Timothy Daniel Sullivan (29 May 1827 – 31 March 1914) was an Irish nationalist, journalist, politician and poet who wrote the Irish national hymn "God Save Ireland", in 1867. He served as Lord Mayor of Dublin from 1886 to 1888 and a Member of Parliament (MP) from 1880 to 1900.

Politician
Sullivan was a member of the Home Rule League, supporting Charles Stewart Parnell in the 1880 general election, being "convinced that without self-government there could never be peace, prosperity or contentment in Ireland". He joined the Irish Parliamentary Party when it was established in 1882. When the party split in 1891, he became an Anti-Parnellite until the Nationalist factions were reunited in 1900.

Sullivan represented a number of constituencies in the House of Commons of the United Kingdom of Great Britain and Ireland. He was elected as an MP for Westmeath in 1880 and served until 1885. In 1885, he was elected to the newly created constituency of Dublin College Green. He joined the anti-Parnellite Irish National Federation in 1891, and was defeated by a Parnellite in the 1892 general election. Four days later he was returned unopposed for West Donegal which he represented until he retired in 1900.

He was Lord Mayor of Dublin in 1886 and 1887.

Publicist
He owned and edited a number of publications (The Nation, Dublin Weekly News and Young Ireland). In December 1887, he published reports of meetings by the Irish National League. As a result, he was convicted and imprisoned for two months under the Crimes Act.

As well as writing the Irish national hymn "God Save Ireland", he wrote the adopted anthem of the All-for-Ireland League: "All for Ireland! One for all! and popular pieces such as "Song from the Backwoods" and "Michael Dwyer".

Family
He was married to Catherine (Kate) Healy who was the sister of Tim Healy, first Governor General of the Irish Free State in 1922. A number of his descendants were people of outstanding distinction. His son Timothy was Chief Justice of Ireland from 1936 to 1946. His daughter Anne (who had sixteen children) was the mother of politician Kevin O'Higgins, one of the dominant political figures of the 1920s. Sullivan's great-grandson Tom O'Higgins served as Chief Justice of Ireland from 1974 to 1985.

His brother, Alexander Martin Sullivan, author of New Ireland and a fervent constitutional and cultural nationalist, was owner and editor of The Nation after Gavan Duffy, and prior to Timothy Daniel Sullivan.

Further reading
 
 1911 census return.
 Who's Who of British members of parliament: Vol. II 1886–1918, edited by M. Stenton & S. Lees (The Harvester Press 1978)

Notes

References
Sullivan, T.D. (1905) Recollections of Troubled Times in Irish Politics. Dublin: Sealy, Bryers & Walker; M.H. Gills & Son, Ltd. Retrieved on 30 March 2011.

External links
 
 
 
 Dunboy, and Other Poems by Timothy Daniel O'Sullivan. Fowler, Dublin. 1861
 Irish National Poems, Timothy Daniel O'Sullivan (Ed.) Gill & Sons, Dublin, 1911

1827 births
1914 deaths
Politicians from County Cork
Irish journalists
Irish newspaper editors
Irish poets
Anti-Parnellite MPs
Home Rule League MPs
Irish Parliamentary Party MPs
Lord Mayors of Dublin
Members of the Parliament of the United Kingdom for County Donegal constituencies (1801–1922)
Members of the Parliament of the United Kingdom for County Dublin constituencies (1801–1922)
Members of the Parliament of the United Kingdom for County Westmeath constituencies (1801–1922)
UK MPs 1880–1885
UK MPs 1885–1886
UK MPs 1886–1892
UK MPs 1892–1895
UK MPs 1895–1900
People from Bantry
19th-century Irish businesspeople